The 1996 United States House of Representatives elections was an election for the United States House of Representatives on November 5, 1996, to elect members to serve in the 105th United States Congress. They coincided with the re-election of President Bill Clinton. Democrats won the popular vote by almost 60,000 votes (0.07%) and gained a net of two seats from the Republicans, but the Republicans retained an overall majority of seats in the House for the first time since 1928.

Although the Republicans lost 3 seats, 1 of them included an Independent who would caucus with them and switch to the Republicans. This resulted in a 227 Republican majority to the Democrats' 208 minority which also included an Independent caucusing with them. A total of 12 Freshman Republicans who were elected in the 1994 Republican Revolution were defeated in the election. The election is similar to the 1952 elections, although, in terms of the total vote this result remains one of the closest in U.S. history.

This remains the last election in which Republicans won a majority of seats in the New Jersey delegation, and was also the first election since Reconstruction in which Republicans won a majority of seats in Mississippi's delegation.

Special elections

Results summary 

Source: Election Statistics – Office of the Clerk

Retiring incumbents 
50 incumbents retired: 29 Democrats and 21 Republicans, giving the Republicans a net gain of 6 seats from the Democrats.

Democrats

Democratic hold 
 : Blanche Lincoln
 : Ray Thornton
 : Anthony Beilenson
 : Pat Schroeder
 : Pete Peterson
 : Sam Gibbons
 : Harry Johnston
 : Cardiss Collins
 : Andrew Jacobs Jr.
 : Gerry Studds
 : Robert Torricelli, to run for U.S. Senator
 : Charlie Rose
 : Jack Reed, to run for U.S. Senator
 : Harold Ford Sr.
 : Jim Chapman, to run for U.S. Senator
 : Charlie Wilson
 : Kika de la Garza
 : Ronald D. Coleman
 : Lewis F. Payne Jr.

Republican gain 
 : Glen Browder, to run for U.S. Senator
 : Tom Bevill
 : Dick Durbin, to run for U.S. Senator
 : Cleo Fields
 : Sonny Montgomery
 : Rick Hill
 : William K. Brewster
 : Tim Johnson, to run for U.S. Senator
 : John Bryant, to run for U.S. Senator
 : Pete Geren

Republicans

Republican hold 
 : Tim Hutchinson, to run for U.S. Senator
 : Carlos Moorhead
 : Wayne Allard, to run for U.S. Senator
 : John Myers
 : Pat Roberts, to run for U.S. Senator
 : Sam Brownback, to run for U.S. Senator
 : Jan Meyers
 : Mel Hancock
 : Barbara Vucanovich
 : Bill Zeliff, to run for Governor
 : Dick Zimmer, to run for U.S. Senator
 : Wes Cooley
 : Bill Clinger
 : Robert Smith Walker
 : Jimmy Quillen
 : Jack Fields
 : Enid Greene

Democratic gain 
 : Jim Ross Lightfoot, to run for U.S. Senator
 : Jimmy Hayes, to run for U.S. Senator
 : Steve Gunderson
 : Toby Roth

Incumbents defeated

In primary elections

Democrats 

 : Barbara-Rose Collins lost to Carolyn Kilpatrick, who later won the general election

Republicans 
 : Greg Laughlin lost to Ron Paul, who later won the general election

In the general elections 
21 seats switched parties in the November elections, giving the Democrats a net gain of 15 seats from the Republicans.

Democrats who lost to Republicans
 : Mike Ward lost to Anne Northup
 : Harold Volkmer lost to Kenny Hulshof
 : Bill Orton lost to Chris Cannon

Republicans who lost to Democrats
 : William P. Baker lost to Ellen Tauscher
 : Andrea Seastrand lost to Walter Capps
 : Bob Dornan lost to Loretta Sanchez
 : Gary Franks lost to James H. Maloney
 : Michael Patrick Flanagan lost to Rod Blagojevich
 : James B. Longley Jr. lost to Tom Allen
 : Peter I. Blute lost to Jim McGovern
 : Peter G. Torkildsen lost to John F. Tierney
 : Dick Chrysler lost to Debbie Stabenow
 : William J. Martini lost to Bill Pascrell
 : Dan Frisa lost to Carolyn McCarthy
 : David Funderburk lost to Bob Etheridge
 : Fred Heineman lost to David Price in a rematch of the 1994 election.
 : Frank Cremeans lost to Ted Strickland
 : Martin Hoke lost to Dennis Kucinich
 : Jim Bunn lost to Darlene Hooley
 : Steve Stockman lost to Nick Lampson
 : Randy Tate lost to Adam Smith

Alabama

Alaska

Arizona

Arkansas

California

Colorado

Connecticut

Delaware

Florida

Georgia

Hawaii

Idaho

Illinois

Indiana

Iowa

Kansas

Kentucky

Louisiana

Maine

Maryland

Massachusetts

Michigan

Minnesota

Mississippi 

With Republican Chip Pickering flipping the Democratic-held 3rd district, the Republican Party gained a majority in the state's U.S. House delegation for the first time since Reconstruction. This would not occur again until 2010.

Missouri 

Jo Ann Emerson was elected as a Republican in a special to serve the remaining months of the term and was elected as an Independent caucusing with Republicans due to Missouri state law. She later switched to the Republican Party a few days after the start of the new Congress.

Montana

Nebraska

Nevada

New Hampshire

New Jersey

New Mexico

New York

North Carolina

North Dakota

Ohio

Oklahoma

Oregon

Pennsylvania

Rhode Island

South Carolina

South Dakota

Tennessee

Texas

Utah

Vermont

Virginia

Washington 

, these were the last elections in which the Republican Party won a majority of congressional districts from Washington.

West Virginia

Wisconsin

Wyoming

See also
 104th United States Congress
 105th United States Congress

Notes

References